Palaeomystella fernandesi is a moth of the family Agonoxenidae. It is found in Atlantic rain forest of Brazil.

The length of the forewings is 4.68–6.11 mm. The forewings are covered mostly by dark-brown scales dorsally, with three interconnected white areas that form a longitudinal S-like band. There is a tenuous, U-shaped band of pale-grey scales following the contours of the tornus. The hindwings are covered in dark brown scales on both sides. Adults are thought to emerge after the winter (September).

The larvae feed on Tibouchina sellowiana. They create a gall on their host plant. Pupation takes place inside the gall, within a cylindrical, longitudinally arranged cocoon made of woven white silk.

Etymology
The species is named in honor of Prof. Dr. Geraldo Wilson Fernandes, Departamento de Biologia Geral, Instituto de Ciências Biológicas, Universidade Federal de Minas Gerais, for his contributions to the development of cecidology in the Neotropics.

Gallery

References

Moths described in 2014
Agonoxeninae
Moths of South America